Beaver Dam is a town in Dodge County, Wisconsin, United States. The population was 3,440 at the 2000 census. The City of Beaver Dam is located within the town. The unincorporated communities of Beaver Edge, Leipsig and Sunset Beach are also located in the town. The ghost town of Clason Prairie was also located in the town.

Geography
The community is at the southeast end of Beaver Dam Lake.

Transportation
 US Route 151 passes through Beaver Dam.

Demographics
At the 2000 census, there were 3,440 people, 1,301 households and 978 families residing in the town. The racial make-up of the town was 96.51% White, 0.06% Black or African American, 0.41% Native American, 0.38% Asian, 1.95% from other races and 0.70% from two or more races. 3.90% of the population were Hispanic or Latino of any race.

There were 1,301 households, of which 34.6% had children under the age of 18 living with them, 65.6% were married couples living together, 6.3% had a female householder with no husband present, and 24.8% were non-families. 20.1% of all households were made up of individuals and 7.8% had someone living alone who was 65 years of age or older. The average household size was 2.64 and the average family size was 3.07.

27.1% of the population were under the age of 18, 5.6% from 18 to 24, 28.1% from 25 to 44, 27.8% from 45 to 64 and 11.5% were 65 years of age or older. The median age was 39 years. For every 100 females, there were 102.4 males. For every 100 females age 18 and over, there were 100.8 males.

The median household income was $49,964 and the median family income was $54,762. Males had a median income of $39,527 and females $22,462. The per capita income was $21,541. About 4.5% of families and 6.0% of the population were below the poverty line, including 9.9% of those under age 18 and 7.3% of those age 65 or over.

References

External links
Town of Beaver Dam, Wisconsin website
Beaver Dam information 
Beaver Dam Chamber of Commerce

Towns in Dodge County, Wisconsin
Towns in Wisconsin